is a former Japanese football player and manager. She played for Japan national team.

Club career
Tezuka was born in Utsunomiya on 6 November 1970. She played for Yomiuri Nippon Beleza (later NTV Beleza). The club won L.League for 3 years in a row (1990-1992). In 1991 season, she became top scorer with 29 goals and she was selected MVP awards. She was also selected Best Eleven for 4 years in a row (1989-1992). End of 1992 season, she retired. However, during 1996 season, she came back and played for NTV Beleza until 1999.

National team career
On 7 March 1986, when Tezuka was 15 years old, she debuted for Japan national team against Chinese Taipei. She played at 1986, 1989, 1991 AFC Championship and 1990 Asian Games. She was also a member of Japan for 1991 World Cup. This competition was her last game for Japan. She played 41 games and scored 19 goals for Japan until 1991.

Coaching career
After retirement, Tezuka started coaching career in her local Tochigi Prefecture. In 2011, she became assistant coach for Japan U-20 and U-17 national team. In October, U-20 team won 2011 AFC U-19 Championship and in November, U-17 team won 2011 AFC U-16 Championship. She has been given the AFC Women's Coach Of The Year Award. In 2013, she was appointed manager for Urawa Reds. However, in June, she resigned for health reasons.

National team statistics

References

External links
 

1970 births
Living people
Association football people from Tochigi Prefecture
Japanese women's footballers
Japan women's international footballers
Nadeshiko League players
Nippon TV Tokyo Verdy Beleza players
Japanese women's football managers
Footballers at the 1990 Asian Games
1991 FIFA Women's World Cup players
Women's association football forwards
Asian Games silver medalists for Japan
Asian Games medalists in football
Medalists at the 1990 Asian Games
Nadeshiko League MVPs